This article contains information about the literary events and publications of 1951.

 — Opening lines of The Catcher in the Rye

Events
January 12 – Janie Moore, C. S. Lewis' so-called adoptive mother, dies.
March – The American writer Flannery O'Connor leaves hospital after being diagnosed with lupus at the age of 25.
March 12 – Hank Ketcham's U.S. Dennis the Menace appears for the first time in 16 United States newspapers.
March 17 – The homonymous U.K. Dennis the Menace comic strip first appears in the children's comic The Beano.
Spring – Arthur C. Clarke's short story "The Sentinel", which will form a basis for the film 2001: A Space Odyssey (1968) and a subsequent novel, is published as "Sentinel of Eternity" in the only issue ever produced of the American science fiction and fantasy pulp magazine 10 Story Fantasy.
May – Joe Orton enters the Royal Academy of Dramatic Art in London, where he meets his lover and ultimate murderer Kenneth Halliwell.
June 18 – Frank Hardy is acquitted of criminal libel in the Australian state of Victoria over his self-published, 1950 roman à clef on corruption in Melbourne political life, Power Without Glory.
July 16 – J. D. Salinger's coming-of-age story The Catcher in the Rye is published by Little, Brown and Company in New York City.
September 6 – William S. Burroughs shoots and kills his common-law wife Joan Vollmer, apparently by accident, in Mexico City.
December 16 – Noël Coward leaves his home, White Cliffs, on the south coast of England, having sold it to Ian Fleming.
unknown dates
E. E. Cummings and Rachel Carson are awarded Guggenheim Fellowships. It is Cummings' second.
Janet Frame's first book, The Lagoon and Other Stories, is published by the Caxton Press (New Zealand) (dated 1952) while the author is a patient in Seacliff Lunatic Asylum, Seacliff, New Zealand, scheduled for a lobotomy. It is awarded the Hubert Church Memorial Award, at the time one of New Zealand's most prestigious literary prizes. This results in the cancellation of Frame's operation.
Béla Hamvas completes his epic novel Karnevál. He is banned from publication in Hungary at the time, so that it will appear only in 1985, 17 years after his death.
The first novel in Anthony Powell's set of twelve, A Dance to the Music of Time, is published by Heinemann in the U.K.
The custom of performing medieval mystery plays is revived at York and Chester, England.
The Théâtre national de la Colline in Paris is founded.

New books

Fiction
Martha Albrand – Desperate Moment
Eric Ambler – Judgment on Deltchev
Sholem Asch – Moses
Isaac Asimov
Foundation
The Stars Like Dust
Nigel Balchin – A Way Through the Wood
Samuel Beckett – Molloy
 Peter Blackmore – The Blue Goose
Ray Bradbury
The Illustrated Man
"The Last Night of the World" (short story)
 John Brophy – Turn the Key Softly
Gill Hunt – Galactic Storm
Taylor Caldwell – The Balance Wheel
Morley Callaghan – The Loved and the Lost
Truman Capote – The Grass Harp
L. Sprague de Camp
Rogue Queen
The Undesired Princess
John Dickson Carr – The Devil in Velvet
 Henry Cecil – The Painswick Line
Camilo José Cela – The Hive (La Colmena)
James Hadley Chase – But a Short Time to Live
Peter Cheyney – Ladies Won't Wait
Agatha Christie
The Under Dog and Other Stories
They Came to Baghdad
Arthur C. Clarke – Prelude to Space
Beverly Cleary – Ellen Tebbits
 Howard Clewes – The Long Memory
 Claud Cockburn – Beat the Devil
Julio Cortázar – Bestiario
Freeman Wills Crofts – French Strikes Oil
Edmund Crispin – The Long Divorce 
Robertson Davies – Tempest-Tost
August Derleth – The Memoirs of Solar Pons
Heimito von Doderer – Die Strudlhofstiege, oder Melzer und die Tiefe der Jahre (The Strudelhof Steps)
Owen Dodson – Boy at the Window
Daphne du Maurier – My Cousin Rachel
Friedrich Dürrenmatt – Suspicion
Howard Fast – Spartacus
Per Anders Fogelström – Sommaren med Monika
Anthony Gilbert – Lady Killer
Michael Gilbert – Death Has Deep Roots
Julien Gracq – Le Rivage des Syrtes (The Opposing Shore)
Graham Greene – The End of the Affair
Henri René Guieu – Le Pionnier de l'atome
 Cyril Hare – An English Murder
John Hawkes – The Beetle Leg
Robert A. Heinlein – The Puppet Masters
 A. P. Herbert – Number Nine
Elizabeth Jane Howard and Robert Aickman – We Are for the Dark: Six Ghost Stories
Laurence Hyde – Southern Cross (wordless novel)
Hammond Innes – Air Bridge
 Michael Innes – Operation Pax
James Jones – From Here to Eternity
Margaret Kennedy – Lucy Carmichael
A. M. Klein – The Second Scroll
Wolfgang Koeppen – Tauben im Gras (Pigeons on the Grass)
Kalki Krishnamurthy
Poiman Karadu
Ponniyin Selvan (பொன்னியின் செல்வன், The Son of Ponni; publication begins)
Louis L'Amour – The Rustlers of the West Fork
Eric Linklater – Laxdale Hall
E. C. R. Lorac –  Murder of a Martinet
Ross Macdonald – The Way Some People Die
Ngaio Marsh – Opening Night
John Masters – Nightrunners of Bengal
François Mauriac – Le Sagouin (The Marmoset)
James A. Michener – Return to Paradise
Nancy Mitford – The Blessing
Gladys Mitchell – The Devil's Elbow
Nicholas Monsarrat – The Cruel Sea
Alberto Moravia – The Conformist (Il conformista)
Robert Pinget – Entre Fantoine et Agapa
Anthony Powell – A Question of Upbringing
J. B. Priestley – Festival at Farbridge
Ernest Raymond – A Chorus Ending
Sax Rohmer – Sumuru
J. D. Salinger – The Catcher in the Rye
Ernst von Salomon – The Questionnaire (Der Fragebogen)
Ooka Shohei (大岡 昇平) – Fires on the Plain (野火, Nobi)
Vern Schneider – The Teahouse of the August Moon
Georges Simenon 
 Maigret and the Burglar's Wife
 Maigret, Lognon and the Gangsters
 Margit Söderholm – Meeting in Vienna
Cardinal Spellman – The Foundling
Howard Spring – The Houses in Between
John Steinbeck – The Log from the Sea of Cortez
Rex Stout
Curtains for Three
Murder by the Book
Cecil Street 
 Beware Your Neighbour
 The Secret Meeting
William Styron – Lie Down in Darkness
Elizabeth Taylor – A Game of Hide and Seek
Phoebe Atwood Taylor – Diplomatic Corpse
Josephine Tey – The Daughter of Time
Jerrard Tickell – Appointment with Venus
Anne de Tourville – Jabadao
Henry Wade – Diplomat’s Folly
 P. G. Wodehouse – The Old Reliable
Herman Wouk – The Caine Mutiny
John Wyndham – The Day of the Triffids
Frank Yerby – A Woman Called Fancy
Marguerite Yourcenar – Memoirs of Hadrian (Mémoires d'Hadrien)
Juan Eduardo Zúñiga – Inútiles totales (Totally useless)

Children and young people
M. E. Atkinson – Castaway Camp (first in the Fricka series of five books)
Rev. W. Awdry – Henry the Green Engine (sixth in The Railway Series of 42 books by him and his son Christopher Awdry)
Viola Bayley – The Dark Lantern
Margaret Biggs – The Blakes Come to Melling
Anne de Vries – Into the Darkness (De Duisternis in, first in the Journey Through the Night – Reis door de nacht – series of four books)
Eleanor Estes – Ginger Pye
Rumer Godden – The Mousewife
Cynthia Harnett – The Wool-Pack
C. S. Lewis – Prince Caspian
Elinor Lyon – We Daren't Go A'Hunting
Gianni Rodari – l romanzo di Cipollino (The Adventures of the Little Onion)
Sydney Taylor – All-of-a-Kind Family

Drama
 Muriel Box and Sydney Box – The Seventh Veil
 Agatha Christie – The Hollow
 Ian Hay – The White Sheep of the Family
 Kenneth Horne – And This Was Odd
Eugène Ionesco – The Lesson (La Leçon)
 Ronald Jeans – Count Your Blessings 
Maryat Lee – Dope!
A. A. Milne – Before the Flood
Lawrence Riley – Kin Hubbard
Jean-Paul Sartre – The Devil and the Good Lord (Le Diable et le Bon Dieu)
Peter Ustinov – 
 The Love of Four Colonels
 The Moment of Truth
John Van Druten – I Am a Camera
John Whiting
A Penny for a Song
Saint's Day (first performance)
Tennessee Williams – The Rose Tattoo

Poetry
Clark Ashton Smith – The Dark Chateau
Frank O'Hara – A City Winter and Other Poems
Iona and Peter Opie – The Oxford Dictionary of Nursery Rhymes

Non-fiction
Nelson Algren – Chicago: City on the Make (essay)
Lou Andreas-Salomé (died 1937) – Lebensrückblick (Looking Back)
Hannah Arendt – The Origins of Totalitarianism
Albert Camus – The Rebel (L'Homme révolté)
Rachel Carson – The Sea Around Us
Nirad C. Chaudhuri – The Autobiography of an Unknown Indian
Wolfgang Clemen – The Development of Shakespeare's Imagery
Thomas B. Costain – The Magnificent Century (second book in the Plantagenet or Pageant of England series)
Daphne du Maurier (ed.) – The Young George du Maurier: a selection of his letters 1860–67
Jacquetta Hawkes
A Land
A Guide to the Prehistoric and Roman Monuments in England and Wales
Eric Hoffer – The True Believer: Thoughts On The Nature Of Mass Movements
Karl Huber (executed 1943) – Leibniz
Dumas Malone – Jefferson and the Rights of Man
C. Wright Mills – White Collar: The American Middle Classes
Vladimir Nabokov – Speak, Memory
J. A. Schumpeter – Imperialism and Social Classes
Tran Duc Thao – Phénoménologie et matérialisme dialectique

Births
January 1 – Ashfaq Hussain, Urdu poet
January 13 – Nigel Cox, New Zealand novelist
January 22 – Steve J. Spears, Australian actor, singer, and playwright (died 2007)
February 13 – Katja Lange-Müller, German novelist
February 17 – Jagadish Mohanty, Indian novelist (died 2013)
March 4 – Theresa Hak Kyung Cha, South Korean-born novelist and artist (died 1982)
March 12 – Susan Musgrave, Canadian poet and children's writer
March 17 - Lian Tanner, Australian children's writer
April 5 – Guy Vanderhaeghe, Canadian author
April 19 – Pierre Lemaitre, French suspense novelist
May 3 – Tatyana Tolstaya, Russian novelist, essayist and TV presenter
May 9
Christopher Dewdney, Canadian poet
Joy Harjo, Native American poet
May 15 – David Almond, English writer for children and young adults
May 20 – Christie Blatchford, Canadian newspaper columnist, journalist, writer and broadcaster (died 2020)
May 21 – Al Franken, American comedian, actor, writer and politician
June 15 – Amir Barghashi, Iranian-born Swedish actor and dramatist
June 22 – Rosario Murillo, Nicaraguan poet and political activist
June 29 – Don Rosa, American writer and artist of Disney comics
August 20 – Greg Bear, American science fiction writer
August 24 – Orson Scott Card, American science fiction writer
September 20 – Javier Marías, Spanish novelist
September 29 – Andrés Caicedo, Colombian novelist and cinema critic (suicide 1977)
October 3 – Bernard Cooper, American writer
October 11 – Louise Rennison, English author and comedian (died 2016)
October 12 – Peter Flannery, English dramatist
October 17 – Clark Parent, Haitian novelist, musician and politician
November 18 - Dennis Foon, Canadian playwright, screenwriter and novelist
December 6 – Tomson Highway, Canadian and Cree playwright, novelist and children's author
December 8 – Bill Bryson, American travel writer
December 22 – Charles de Lint, Canadian fantasy author and Celtic folk musician
Unknown dates
Mohammed Achaari, Moroccan writer
Carol Birch, English novelist

Deaths
January 7 – René Guénon, French philosophical writer (born 1886)
January 10 – Sinclair Lewis, American novelist (born 1885)
January 29 – James Bridie, Scottish dramatist (born 1888)
February 13 – Lloyd C. Douglas, American author (born 1877)
February 16 – Henri-René Lenormand, French dramatist (born 1882)
February 19 – André Gide, French author (born 1869)
February 28 – Vsevolod Vishnevsky, Russian dramatist and screenwriter (born 1900)
March 25 – Oscar Micheaux, African American author, film director and producer (born 1884)
April 3 – Henrik Visnapuu, Estonian poet and dramatist (born 1890)
April 9 – Sadegh Hedayat, Iranian-born novelist (born 1903; suicide)
April 12 - Henry De Vere Stacpoole. Irish author (born 1863)
April 29 – Ludwig Wittgenstein, Austrian philosopher (born 1889)
May 30 – Hermann Broch, Austrian writer (born 1886)
June 10 – Håkon Evjenth, Norwegian children's writer (born 1894)
June 11 – W. C. Sellar, Scottish humorist (born 1898)
August 14 – William Randolph Hearst, American newspaper tycoon (born 1863)
August 18 – Richard Malden, English editor, classical and Biblical scholar, and ghost story writer (born 1879)
August 31 – Abraham Cahan, American Jewish journalist and novelist (born 1860)
September 2 – Antoine Bibesco, Romanian dramatist (born 1878)
September 7 – F. G. Loring, English writer and naval officer (born 1869)
September 28 – Petre P. Negulescu, Romanian philosopher (born 1870)
November 5 – I. C. Vissarion, Romanian novelist, dramatist, poet and science writer (born 1879)
November 27 – Timrava (Božena Slančíková), Slovak novelist, short story writer and playwright (born 1867)
December 4 – Pedro Salinas, Spanish poet (born 1891)
December 10 – Algernon Blackwood, English novelist and journalist (born 1869)

Awards
Carnegie Medal for children's literature: Cynthia Harnett, The Wool-Pack
Frost Medal: Wallace Stevens
James Tait Black Memorial Prize for fiction: Chapman Mortimer, Father Goose
James Tait Black Memorial Prize for biography: Noel Annan, Leslie Stephen
Newbery Medal: Elizabeth Yates, Amos Fortune, Free Man
Nobel Prize in Literature: Pär Lagerkvist
Premio Nadal: Luis Romero, La noria
Pulitzer Prize for Drama: no award given
Pulitzer Prize for Fiction: Conrad Richter, The Town
Pulitzer Prize for Poetry: Carl Sandburg, Complete Poems

Notes

References

 
Years of the 20th century in literature